Kanlıdivane (ancient Canytelis, Greek: Κανυτελής) is an ancient city situated around a big sinkhole in Mersin Province, Turkey.

Geography 
It is close to the town Kumkuyu at the coast and just few hundred meters to Çanakçı rock tombs.

The sinkhole is quite wide; the longer dimension being . The depth is about

History 
There are ruins of antiquity around the sinkhole. They were unearthed and surveyed by Victor Langlois and Semavi Eyice.

Pre Roman era 
Kanlıdivane was a part of the Olba Kingdom in the ancient age. In the northern necropolis, there is a mausoleum, which was built by the Queen Aba for her husband and sons. On the inscription of the tower at south-west it reads;
"Built by Teukros, the son of priest king Tarkyaris of Olba for Zeus."

Roman era 
By the first century, Olba kingdom became a vassal of the Roman Empire. Byzantine Emperor Theodosius II rebuilt the city as a Christian religious center and renamed it Neapolis. There are ruins of basilicas, cisterns, rock cut graves etc. around the sinkhole.

Kanlıdivane in popular culture 
The current Turkish name Kanlıdivane may be a corrupt form of the ancient name  Canytelis. It means "bloody crazy". It may refer to the red color of the surrounding soil. The name may also refer to a dreadful legend according to which the criminals had been executed by throwing into the sinkhole during Roman times.

Kanlıdivane in Mersin Music Festival 
Every year during Mersin International Music Festival, one or two outdoor concerts are held in Kanlıdivane. The audiences and performers sit at the opposite sides of the sinkhole. (During such concerts Metropolitan municipality of Mersin add free bus trips to Kanlıdivane.)

See also 
 List of sinkholes of Turkey
 Kanytelis

References

External links 

Photographic visit to the site

Ruins in Turkey
Archaeological sites in Mersin Province, Turkey
Music venues in Turkey
Sinkholes of Turkey
Landforms of Mersin Province
Olba territorium